Niceto Vega (March 19, 1799 - May 23, 1841) was an Argentine colonel. Born in Buenos Aires, he took part in the campaign of José de San Martín to Peru. He fought in the Argentine Civil Wars under the command of the unitarian Juan Lavalle, against the governor Juan Manuel de Rosas.

References 

People of the Peruvian War of Independence
Argentine colonels
Unitarianists (Argentina)
1799 births
1841 deaths